Aiglon may refer to:

Music and film
L'Aiglon (1900), Romantic drama about the above by Edmond Rostand
L'Aiglon (opera) (1937), operetta composed by Arthur Honegger and Jacques Ibert, after Rostand's play
Les Aiglons, Guadeloupean band
Napoléon II l'Aiglon (1961), French drama film based on a book by André Castelot

Sports
Aiglon du Lamentin, Martinique football club
Aiglons (football club), Togolese football club, one of the 1987 FIFA World Youth Championship squads#Togo

Transportation
Aiglon, an early 20th-century French car also called the Alliance (1905 automobile)
Aiglon (motorcycle), French motorcycle 
Caudron C.600 Aiglon, 1930s French light touring monoplane
Robin Aiglon, 1980s French Four-seat touring monoplane
Société Aiglon, French aircraft manufacturer

Other
Aiglon College in Switzerland
L'Aiglon ("The Eaglet"), nickname for Napoleon II, son of Napoleon I and very briefly Emperor of the French